Copelatus pardii is a species of diving beetle. It is part of the genus Copelatus in the subfamily Copelatinae of the family Dytiscidae. It was described by Rocchi in 1990.

References

pardii
Beetles described in 1990